CBC Selects is a Canadian television anthology series, which premiered on CBC Television on October 5, 2014. The series will present a variety of programs from other public broadcasters around the world, including the BBC and the Australian Broadcasting Corporation.

The first program airing as part of CBC Selects is the Australian drama series Janet King.

The second program will be the BBC's nature documentary Life Story.

References

2014 Canadian television series debuts
2010s Canadian anthology television series
CBC Television original programming